Bruce Wilson (10 May 1941 – 3 January 2006) was an Australian journalist, best known as a commentator on rugby union.

He was known mostly for his sports journalism, throughout his five-decade career writing articles on cricket and rugby events with The Herald, The Sun and the Herald Sun, mostly as a foreign correspondent. He also travelled to areas such as the Middle East and South Vietnam as part of his journalism career.

Family 
Wilson died from cancer on 3 January 2006, and is survived by his fourth wife, Clare Hardman, whom he met and married in London, and his two surviving children: Seven Network broadcaster and journalist Jim Wilson and Women's Day Queensland correspondent and writer Lizzie Wilson. His other daughter, News Limited sports journalist and radio/television personality Rebecca Wilson, died in October 2016.

External links
Herald Sun obituary

2006 deaths
1941 births
Deaths from cancer in England
Australian rugby union commentators
20th-century Australian journalists